At about 21:00 on the night of 4 March 2001, the Hintze Ribeiro disaster (also known as Entre-os-Rios disaster) occurred when the steel and concrete Hintze Ribeiro Bridge collapsed in Entre-os-Rios, Castelo de Paiva, northern Portugal, killing 59 people, including those in a bus from the Asadouro company and three cars that were crossing the Douro river. Fast waters and a storm at the time gave no chance for an immediate rescue, and the victims drowned. Bodies were found as far away as the north coast of Spain and one even in France. Hours after the accident, the Minister of Social Equipment Jorge Coelho resigned. The following week, dozens of bridges across Portugal were closed for immediate repair. The tragedy caused widespread shock across the nation, with all television networks broadcasting continuous news bulletins, and many solidarity campaigns being organized to help the victims' relatives.

The bridge had linked Castelo de Paiva, Aveiro District and Entre-os-Rios, Porto District. After the loss of the bridge, residents of Castelo de Paiva had to travel an additional  to reach the Porto area. The bridge was more than 100 years old. The collapse was caused by uncontrolled sand extraction over many years, which compromised the stability of the bridge's pillars. Warnings from divers and technicians had been ignored. The sand extractors were prosecuted and sued.

See also
Bridge scour
List of bridge failures

References

2001 disasters in Portugal
Bridge disasters caused by maintenance error
Bridge disasters in Portugal
Bus incidents in Portugal
Castelo de Paiva
Transport disasters in Portugal
2001 in Portugal
2001 road incidents
March 2001 events in Europe